Luce Irigaray (born 3 May 1930) is a Belgian-born French feminist, philosopher, linguist, psycholinguist, psychoanalyst, and cultural theorist who examined the uses and misuses of language in relation to women. Irigaray's first and most well known book, published in 1974, was Speculum of the Other Woman (1974), which analyzes the texts of Freud, Hegel, Plato, Aristotle, Descartes, and Kant through the lens of phallocentrism. Irigaray is the author of works analyzing many thinkers, including This Sex Which Is Not One (1977), which discusses Lacan's work as well as political economy; Elemental Passions (1982) can be read as a response to Merleau‐Ponty's article “The Intertwining—The Chiasm” in The Visible and the Invisible, and in The Forgetting of Air in Martin Heidegger (1999), Irigaray critiques Heidegger's emphasis on the element of earth as the ground of life and speech and his "oblivion" or forgetting of air.

Irigaray employs three different modes in her investigations into the nature of gender, language, and identity: the analytic, the essayistic, and the lyrical poetic. As of October 2021, she is active in the Women's Movements in both France and Italy.

Education
Luce Irigaray received a bachelor's degree from the University of Louvain in 1954, a master's degree from the same university in 1956, and taught at a high school in Brussels from 1956 to 1959.

In 1960, she moved to Paris to pursue a master's degree in Psychology from the University of Paris, which she earned in 1961. She also received a specialist diploma in Psychopathology from the school in 1962. In 1968, she received a doctorate in Linguistics from Paris X Nanterre. Her thesis was titled .

She completed a PhD in linguistics in 1968 from the University of Vincennes in Saint-Denis (University of Paris VIII). Her dissertation on speech patterns of subjects suffering from dementia became her first book, published in 1973. In 1974, she earned a second PhD in Philosophy.

In the 1960s, Irigaray started attending the psychoanalytic seminars of Jacques Lacan and joined the École Freudienne de Paris (Freudian School of Paris), directed by Lacan. She was expelled from this school in 1974, after the publication of her second doctoral thesis (doctorat d'État), Speculum of the Other Woman (later retitled as ), which received much criticism from both the Lacanian and Freudian schools of psychoanalysis. This criticism brought her recognition, but she was removed from her position as an instructor at the University of Vincennes as well as ostracized from the Lacanian community.

She held a research post at the Centre national de la recherche scientifique since 1964, where she is now a Director of Research in Philosophy. Her initial research focused on dementia patients, about whom she produced a study of the differences between the language of male and female patients.

It has also been noted that in her writings, Irigaray has stated a concern that an interest in her biography would affect the interpretation of her ideas, as the entrance of women into intellectual discussions has often also included the challenging of women's point of view based on biographical material. Her most extensive autobiographical statements thus far are gathered in Through Vegetal Being (co-authored with Michael Marder). Overall, she maintains the belief that biographical details pertaining to her personal life hold the possibility to be used against her within the male dominated educational establishment as a tool to discredit her work. However, at age 91, she published A New Culture of Energy: Beyond East and West (2021) in which she discusses her decades-long practices of yoga asanas (postures) and pranayama (breathing) and maintains that yoga builds a bridge between body and spirit.

Major works

Speculum of the Other Woman (Speculum de l'autre femme) 
Her first major book, Speculum of the Other Woman, based on her second dissertation, was published in 1974. In Speculum, Irigaray engages in close analyses of phallocentrism in Western philosophy and psychoanalytic theory, analyzing texts by Freud, Hegel, Plato, Aristotle, Descartes, and Kant. The book's most cited essay, "The Blind Spot of an Old Dream," critiques Freud's lecture on femininity.

This Sex Which is Not One (Ce sexe qui n'en est pas un) 
In 1977, Irigaray published This Sex Which is Not One which was subsequently translated into English with that title and published in 1985, along with Speculum. In addition to more commentary on psychoanalysis, including discussions of Lacan's work, This Sex Which is Not One also comments on political economy, drawing on structuralist writers such as Lévi-Strauss. For example, Irigaray argues that the phallic economy places women alongside signs and currency, since all forms of exchange are conducted exclusively between men.

"Women on the Market" (Chapter Eight of This Sex Which is Not One) 
Irigaray draws upon Karl Marx’s theory of capital and commodities to claim that women are exchanged between men in the same way as any other commodity is. She argues that our entire society is predicated on this exchange of women.  Her exchange value is determined by society, while her use value is her natural qualities. Thus, a woman’s self is divided between her use and exchange values, and she is only desired for the exchange value. This system creates three types of women: the mother, who is all use value; the virgin, who is all exchange value; and the prostitute, who embodies both use and exchange value.

She further uses additional Marxist foundations to argue that women are in demand due to their perceived shortage and as a result, males seek "to have them all," or seek a surplus like the excess of commodity buying power, capital, that capitalists seek constantly. Irigaray speculates thus that perhaps, "the way women are used matter less than their number." In this further analogy of women "on the market," understood through Marxist terms, Irigaray points out that women, like commodities, are moved between men based on their exchange value rather than just their use value, and the desire will always be surplus – making women almost seem like capital, in this case, to be accumulated. "As commodities, women are thus two things at once: utilitarian objects and bearers of value."

Elemental Passions 
Luce Irigaray's Elemental Passions (1982) could be read as a response to Merleau‐Ponty's article “The Intertwining—The Chiasm” in The Visible and the Invisible. Like Merleau‐Ponty, Irigaray describes corporeal intertwining or vision and touch. Counteracting the narcissistic strain in Merleau‐Ponty's chiasm, she assumes that sexual difference must precede the intertwining. The subject is marked by the alterity or the “more than one” and encoded as a historically contingent gendered conflict.

Themes

Philosophy 
Some of Irigaray's books written in her lyrical mode are imaginary dialogues with significant contributors to Western philosophy, such as Nietzsche and Heidegger. However, Irigaray also writes a significant body of work on Hegel, Descartes, Plato, Aristotle and Levinas, Spinoza, as well as Merleau-Ponty. Her academic work is largely influenced by a wide range of philosophers and cannot be limited to one approach.

Language 
She continued to conduct empirical studies about language in a variety of settings, researching the differences between the way men and women speak. This focus on sexual difference is the key characteristic of Irigaray's oeuvre, since she is seeking to provide a site from which a feminine language can eventuate. Through her research, Irigaray discovered a correlation between the suppression of female thought in the Western world and language of men and women. She concluded that there are gendered language patterns that denote dominance in men and subjectivity in women.

Gender identity 
Since 1990, Irigaray's work has turned increasingly toward women and men together. In Between East and West, From Singularity to Community (1999) and in The Way of Love (2002), she imagines new forms of love for a global democratic community. In An Ethics of Sexual Difference, she introduces the idea of relationships between men and women centered around a bond other than reproduction. She acknowledges themes including finiteness and intersubjectivity, embodied divinity, and the emotional distinction between the two sexes. She concludes that Western culture is unethical due to gender discrimination.

Politics 
Irigaray is active in a feminist movement in Italy, but she refused to belong to any one movement because she does not like the competitive dynamic between the feminist movements.

Criticism
Some feminists criticize Irigaray's perceived essentialist positions. However, there is much debate among scholars as to whether or not Irigaray's theory of sexual difference is, indeed, an essentialist one. The perception that her work is essentialist concentrates on her attention to sexual difference, taking this to constitute a rehearsal of heteronormative sexuality. As Helen Fielding states, the uneasiness among feminists about Irigaray's discussion of masculinity and femininity does not so much reveal Irigaray's heteronormative bias as much as it "arises out of an inherited cultural understanding [on the part of her critics] that posits nature as either unchanging organism or as matter that can be ordered, manipulated and inscribed upon. Hence the concern over essentialism is itself grounded in the binary thinking that preserves a hierarchy of...culture over nature."

W. A. Borody has criticised Irigaray's phallogocentric argument as misrepresenting the history of philosophies of "indeterminateness" in the West. Irigaray's "black and white" claims that the masculine equates to determinateness and that the feminine equates to indeterminateness which contain a degree of cultural and historical validity, but not when they are deployed to self-replicate a similar form of the gender-othering they originally sought to overcome.

In Fashionable Nonsense, Alan Sokal and Jean Bricmont criticized Irigaray's use of hard-science terminology in her writings. Among the criticisms, they question the purported interest Einstein had in "accelerations without electromagnetic reequilibrations"; confusing special relativity and general relativity; and her claim that  is a "sexed equation" because "it privileges the speed of light over other speeds that are vitally necessary to us". In reviewing Sokal and Bricmont's book, Richard Dawkins wrote that Irigaray's assertion that fluid mechanics was unfairly neglected in physics due to its association with "feminine" fluids (in contrast to "masculine" solids) was "daffy absurdity".

Selected bibliography

Books
  (Eng. trans. 1985 by Gillian C. Gill), .
  (Eng. trans. 1985), .
  (Eng. trans. 1991 by Gillian C. Gill), .
  (Eng. trans. 1992), .
  (Eng. trans. 1999), .
  (Eng. trans. 1993 by Gillian C. Gill), .
  (Eng. trans. 2002), .
  (Eng. trans. 1993 by Gillian C. Gill), .
  (Eng. trans. 1993), .
  (Eng. trans. 1993), .
  (Eng. trans. 1993), .
  (Eng. trans. 2000), .
  (Eng. trans. 2001), .
  (Eng. trans. 2001), .
 Irigaray, Luce (2000). Why Different?, .
 .
  (Eng. trans. 2008), .
 Irigaray, Luce (2008). Conversations, .
   
  .
  .
  .

Papers
 
 
 Luce Irigaray (1999), "Philosophy in the Feminine", Feminist Review, Volume 42, Issue 1, pp 111–114, ISSN 1466-4380. 
 
 Irigaray, Luce (1981), "And the One Doesn't Stir Without the Other", Signs, Vol. 7, No. 1, pp. 60–67.
Irigaray, Luce (1980), "When Our Lips Speak Together", Signs, Vol. 6, No. 1, pp. 69–79.

See also

References

Further reading 

 
 Sjöholm, Cecilia. "Crossing Lovers: Luce Irigaray's Elemental Passions." Hypatia, 2000

External links

 
 http://mythosandlogos.com/Irigaray.html
 https://www.cddc.vt.edu/feminism/Irigaray.html
 http://criticallegalthinking.com/2013/06/06/equality-luce-irigaray/

1930 births
20th-century French non-fiction writers
20th-century French philosophers
21st-century French non-fiction writers
21st-century French philosophers
Academics of the University of Nottingham
Catholic University of Leuven (1834–1968) alumni
Academic staff of Paris 8 University Vincennes-Saint-Denis
Continental philosophers
Critical theorists
Academic staff of Erasmus University Rotterdam
Feminist philosophers
Feminist studies scholars
Feminist theorists
French feminists
French psychoanalysts
French women philosophers
Linguists from France
Women linguists
Living people
Philosophers of language
Philosophers of mind
Philosophers of psychology
Philosophers of sexuality
Postmodern feminists
University of Paris alumni
Feminist psychologists
20th-century French women